Streptomyces omiyaensis is a bacterium species from the genus of Streptomyces which has been isolated from soil in Japan. Streptomyces omiyaensis produces chloramphenicol and pentalenolactone P.

See also 
 List of Streptomyces species

References

Further reading

External links
Type strain of Streptomyces omiyaensis at BacDive -  the Bacterial Diversity Metadatabase

omiyaensis
Bacteria described in 1950